Frank Edward Clack (30 March 1912 – 2 June 1995) was an English professional footballer born in Witney, Oxfordshire, who played as a goalkeeper. He made 127 appearances in the Football League playing for Birmingham and Bristol City.

After several years with Birmingham as understudy to England international Harry Hibbs, Clack joined Brentford before the 1939–40 season, but the outbreak of the Second World War prevented him playing for them. After the war he spent two seasons as first-choice goalkeeper with Bristol City before moving into non-league football.

References

1912 births
1995 deaths
People from Witney
English footballers
Association football goalkeepers
Birmingham City F.C. players
Brentford F.C. players
Bristol City F.C. players
Guildford City F.C. players
Dover F.C. players
English Football League players